Almeirim is a village on São Tomé Island in the nation of São Tomé and Príncipe. Its population is 1,591 (2012 census). It is in the southern part of the Água Grande District and borders the city São Tomé to the northeast.

Population history

References

Populated places in Água Grande District